George Henry Byer (June 22, 1912 - August 22, 2000) was an American politician who served as Mayor of Anchorage, Alaska from 1959 to 1961.  He was the first full-time mayor of Anchorage, and was chiefly responsible for Anchorage's first two All-America City Award designations.

He was a Democrat.

Biography
George Byer, born on June 22, 1912, moved to Alaska in 1947, after serving in the United States Army during World War II. From 1951, he worked as a mail carrier. In 1956, he campaigned successfully to have Anchorage named as "All-America City", and in 1959 he was elected mayor of the city, serving two terms. From 1963 to 1966 he sat on Anchorage's City Council, during which time he lobbied to renew Anchorage's "All-America City" status (1965), and launched an unsuccessful bid to bring the 1972 Winter Olympics to Anchorage. In 1967, he ran once again for Mayor of Anchorage, but lost to George M. Sullivan.

In later years, he lived in Hemet, California and was active in efforts to promote world peace.

Byer died, age 88, of heart disease in Hemet on August 22, 2000.

References 

1912 births
2000 deaths
Mayors of Anchorage, Alaska
Alaska city council members
20th-century American politicians